Paulsson is a Swedish patronymic surname meaning "son of Paul", itself an English language derivative of the ancient Roman (pre-Christian) nomen Paulus, meaning "small".  There are over 200 variants of the surname.  Within Sweden, an alternate spelling is Pålsson, while the Icelandic is Pálsson, and the British Isles is Paulson.  Paulsson is uncommon as a given name.

People with the surname include:
 Erik Paulsson, billionaire businessman
 Gunnar S. Paulsson, British historian
 Haakon Paulsson, joint Earl of Orkney
 Marcus Paulsson, ice hockey player

References

Swedish-language surnames
Surnames
Patronymic surnames
Surnames from given names